The Campiglia Marittima-Piombino railway line, also known as the Cornia Valley Railway is an Italian railway line that connects the junction at Campiglia Marittima with the port town of Piombino.

Traffic 
The line is served by regionale and regionale veloce trains operated by Trenitalia, of which most continue from Campiglia Marittima to Pisa Centrale and Florence SMN.

Gallery

See also 
Campiglia Marittima railway station,
Tirrenica railway

References

Footnotes

Bibliography 

Adriano Betti Carboncini, La ferrovia di Piombino, in "I Treni Oggi" no. 34 (December 1983). (in Italian)
Adriano Betti Carboncini, La ferrovia Campiglia Marittima Piombino e l'industria siderurgica piombinese, La Bancarella, 2016, ISBN 978-88-6615-128-9 (in Italian)

Railway lines in Italy